Rawhide Mail is a 1934 American Western film directed by Bernard B. Ray and starring Jack Perrin, Nelson McDowell and Chris-Pin Martin.

Main cast
 Jack Perrin as Jack Reed
 Nelson McDowell as Judge
 Chris-Pin Martin as Pedro Esteban
 Lillian Gilmore as Nora Hastings
 Richard Cramer as Hal Drummond
 Lafe McKee as Sheriff
 George Chesebro as Porky - Henchman
 Jimmy Aubrey as Mike - Henchman
 Robert Walker as Brown - the Buyer
 Lew Meehan as Tim - Bartender

References

Bibliography
 Pitts, Michael R. Poverty Row Studios, 1929–1940: An Illustrated History of 55 Independent Film Companies, with a Filmography for Each. McFarland & Company, 2005.

External links
 

1934 films
1930s action adventure films
Films directed by Bernard B. Ray
Reliable Pictures films
American black-and-white films
American action adventure films
1934 Western (genre) films
American Western (genre) films
1930s English-language films
1930s American films